Vidyartha College (Sinhala:විද්‍යාර්ථ විද්‍යලය) is an all-male national school located in the Central Province of Sri Lanka. The college was founded in 1942 by the Vidyartha Society, and is currently run by the Government of Sri Lanka. The college has two sections: the primary section which includes grades 1-5; and the secondary section which includes students in grades 6-13.

History
Although there were many educational opportunities for Buddhist children in the Central Province during the early 1900s, there was a lack of education in English . This deficiency led Sir Tikiri Bandara Panabokke to create the Vidyartha Society in 1939. Other contributors to this project were T. B. Panabokke, M. B. Panabokke, S. L. Ratwatte, A. C. L. Ratwatte, William Gopallawa (President of Sri Lanka), T. B. Ranaraja, A. B. Pinnawala, K. B. Wijekoon, R. Divithotawela, A. Rathnayake, G. D. A. Abeyrathne, Dr. L. B. Senevirathne, L. M. Koswatta, M. B. E. Senevirathne and M. B. Kulugammana. The Society eventually purchased a private school named King's College, which was located on a rise on Katugasthota Road. Later, the name was changed to Vidyartha College. The new college had forty students and six teachers, and the first principal was G. D. A. Abeyratne. On 1 August 1961, the government took control of the college and still maintains control today.

Development
Vidyartha College quickly became a popular school in Sri Lanka. A hostel and main hall were added, so that the college could accept more students; children in rural areas such as Anuradhapura, Polonnaruwa, Ampara, Monaragala were now able to attend Vidyartha.

In 1954, an Advanced Level of Examination was held at Vidyartha for the first time. The college has since added three programs: Science in 1958, Commerce in 1972, and Information Technology in 1994.

A Colombo branch was formed in 1987 by C. K. Gajanayake, who was its first President. Major-General H. M. N. Krishnaratne RSP USP (Rtd) is the incumbent President of the Colombo branch and Ranjith Weeerasinghe functions as the Honorary Secretary.

When the college was first established, it only had a few buildings, a principal, and 8 teachers. Today, there are nearly 5,000 students receiving their education in the College, with a teaching staff of more than 180.

Principals

Vidyartha Old Boys Association (OBA)
Vidyartha Old Boys Association (OBA) is the strongest supporting body for the college; its members work to improve the college's qualities and standards, as well as its reputation. The association holds an Annual General Meeting where projects are decided on and committees appointed. There are many sub-organizations attached to the Vidyartha College OBA including:

 Vidyartha Rugby Development Group (VRDG)
 Tigers Rugby Club (TRC)
 Vidyartha College Old Boys’ Association - Colombo Branch
 Vidyartha Cricket Foundation (VCF)
 Vidyartha Past Media Forum 
 Vidyartha Graduate Circle
 Vidyartha College Athletic Association
 Vidyartha Pushpadana union 
 Old Vidyarthians Boxing Club
 Old Vidyarthians Cadet Band Club
 Vidyartha Hockey Club

Vidyartha College's old boys association is one of the most powerful OBAs in Sri Lanka.

Notable alumni

Notes

College houses
The names of the college houses:
 Parackrama, colour : Blue 
 Wickrama colour : Maroon 
 Mahinda, colour : Yellow 
 Narendra, colour : Light blue

References

Buddhist schools in Sri Lanka
Educational institutions established in 1942
National schools in Sri Lanka
Schools in Kandy
1942 establishments in Ceylon